Chateau Bay (sometimes called Chateaux Bay) is a bay and former settlement in Labrador, Canada. Historically it is also sometimes called York Harbour, a name given by James Webb in 1760 when he claimed the harbour for the English. It was surveyed by James Cook in 1763, during his survey of the Strait of Belle Isle aboard HMS Grenville. In August 1766 Joseph Banks arrived in Chateau Bay as a part of a partially scientific journey to study and collect the plants and animals. One of the specimens collected there was the now extinct great auk.

References

Notes

Ghost towns in Newfoundland and Labrador
Bays of Newfoundland and Labrador